Putative tyrosine-protein phosphatase TPTE is an enzyme that in humans is encoded by the TPTE gene.

Function 

TPTE is a member of a large class of membrane-associated phosphatases with substrate specificity for the 3-position phosphate of inositol phospholipids. TPTE is a primate-specific duplicate of the TPTE2 (TPIP) inositol phospholipd phosphatase; TPTE itself is predicted to lack phosphatase activity. TPTE and TPTE2 are the mammalian homologues to the subfamily of voltage sensitive phosphatases.

References

Further reading